Bembidion mckinleyi is a species of ground beetle in the family Carabidae. It is found in North America and Europe.

Subspecies
These three subspecies belong to the species Bembidion mckinleyi:
 Bembidion mckinleyi carneum Lindroth, 1963
 Bembidion mckinleyi mckinleyi Fall, 1926
 Bembidion mckinleyi scandicum Lindroth, 1943

References

Further reading

External links

 

mckinleyi
Articles created by Qbugbot
Beetles described in 1926